Bank of Jerusalem, Ltd. is Israel's seventh largest bank, with total assets of 9,301 million shekels.

History
The bank was founded in 1963 as a mortgage bank to support housing development in Jerusalem by Mordechai Meir, Charles Clore, Isaac Wolfson and the Municipality of Jerusalem.  

In 1992, the bank had an initial public offering on the Tel Aviv Stock Exchange. In August 1998, Bank of Jerusalem received a commercial banking license from the Bank of Israel, replacing the financial-institution license that it had held until then. By obtaining this license, Bank of Jerusalem completed its transformation into a commercial bank that specializes in real estate, the capital market, and international banking.

Since 2010 the bank has been focusing on developing its retail banking activities, offering current accounts and savings accounts to consumers.  

Bank of Jerusalem is headquartered in Jerusalem and has 24 branches around the country.

The bank is controlled by Export Investment Corp., Ltd., a public company controlled by the Shoval family.

Criticism

Involvement in Israeli settlements

On 12 February 2020, the United Nations published a database of companies doing business related in the West Bank, including East Jerusalem, as well as in the occupied Golan Heights. Bank of Jerusalem was listed on the database on account of its activities in Israeli settlements in these occupied territories, which are considered illegal under international law.

See also
 Bank of Israel

References

External links
 Bank of Jerusalem

Companies based in Jerusalem
Banks of Israel
Financial services companies of Israel
Banks established in 1963
Organizations based in Jerusalem